José Antonio Huentelaf Santana (born 22 January 1989) is a Chilean footballer that currently plays for Deportes Melipilla in the Primera B de Chile.

Honours

Club
Universidad de Concepción
 Copa Chile: 2014–15

External links
 
 

1989 births
Living people
Chilean people of Mapuche descent
Mapuche sportspeople
Indigenous sportspeople of the Americas
Chilean footballers
Primera B de Chile players
Chilean Primera División players
Lota Schwager footballers
Universidad de Concepción footballers
Deportes Temuco footballers
Sportspeople from Viña del Mar
Association football wingers